This is a list of freshwater fish species found in Sumatra, Indonesia. The listing below is based on the taxonomic treatment of Nelson (2015) and Betancur-Rodriguez et al. (2017).

Order Carcharhiniformes

Family Carcharhinidae
Carcharhinus leucas (Müller & Henle, 1839)

Order Pristiformes

Family Pristidae
Pristis pristis (Linnaeus, 1758)

Order Myliobatiformes

Family Dasyatidae
Fluvitrygon kittipongi Vidthayanon & Roberts, 2005
Fluvitrygon signifer Compagno & Roberts, 1982
Fluvitrygon oxyrhyncha (Sauvage, 1878)
Urogymnus polylepis (Bleeker, 1852)

Order Osteoglossiformes

Family Osteoglossidae
Scleropages formosus (Müller & Schlegel, 1844)

Family Notopteridae
Chitala borneensis (Bleeker, 1851)
Chitala hypselonotus (Bleeker, 1851)
Notopterus notopterus (Pallas, 1769)

Order Elopiformes

Family Megalopidae
Megalops cyprinoides  (Broussonet, 1782)

Order Anguilliformes

Family Anguillidae
Anguilla bengalensis (Gray, 1831)
Anguilla bicolor McClelland, 1844

Family Muraenidae
Gymnothorax tile (Hamilton, 1822)
Gymnothorax polyuranodon (Bleeker, 1854)

Order Clupeiformes

Family Clupeidae
Clupeichthys goniognathus Bleeker, 1855
Clupeichthys perakensis (Herre, 1936)
Clupeoides borneensis Bleeker, 1851
Sundasalanx platyrhynchus Siebert & Crimmen, 1997

Family Engraulididae
Coilia borneensis (Bleeker, 1852)
Coilia lindmani Bleeker, 1858
Lycothrissa crocodilus (Bleeker, 1851)
Setipinna melanochir (Bleeker, 1849)

Order Cypriniformes

Family Cyprinidae
Albulichthys albuloides (Bleeker, 1855)
Amblyrhynchichthys truncatus (Bleeker, 1851)
Balantiocheilos melanopterus (Bleeker, 1851)
Barbichthys laevis (Valenciennes, 1842)
Barbodes sellifer (Kottelat & Lim, 2021)
Barbodes binotatus (Valenciennes, 1842)
Barbodes dorsimaculatus (Ahl, 1923)
Barbodes lateristriga (Valenciennes, 1842)
Barbonymus balleroides (Valenciennes, 1842)
Barbonymus belinka (Bleeker, 1860)
Barbonymus gonionotus (Bleeker, 1850)
Barbonymus schwanenfeldii (Bleeker, 1854)
Crossocheilus cobitis (Bleeker, 1854)
Crossocheilus gnathopogon Weber & de Beaufort, 1916
Crossocheilus langei Bleeker, 1860
Crossocheilus oblongus Kuhl & van Hasselt, 1823
Crossocheilus obscurus Tan & Kottelat, 2009
Cyclocheilichthys apogon (Valenciennes, 1842)
Cyclocheilichthys armatus (Valenciennes, 1842)
Cyclocheilichthys enoplos (Bleeker, 1850)
Cyclocheilichthys heteronema (Bleeker, 1854)
Cyclocheilichthys repasson (Bleeker, 1853)
Desmopuntius gemellus (Kottelat, 1996)
Desmopuntius hexazona (Weber & de Beaufort, 1912)
Desmopuntius johorensis (Duncker, 1904)
Diplocheilichthys pleurotaenia (Bleeker, 1855)
Eirmotus furvus Tan & Kottelat, 2008
Eirmotus insignis Tan & Kottelat, 2008 (Belitung)
Eirmotus isthmus Tan & Kottelat, 2008
Epalzeorhynchos kalopterum (Bleeker, 1851)
Hampala ampalong (Bleeker, 1852)
Hampala macrolepidota Kuhl & van Hasselt, 1823
Hypsibarbus birtwistlei (Herre, 1940)
Hypsibarbus huguenini (Bleeker, 1853)
Labeo chrysophekadion (Bleeker, 1850)
Labeo erythropterus Valenciennes, 1842
Labeo pietschmanni Machan, 1930
Labiobarbus fasciatus (Bleeker, 1853)
Labiobarbus festivus (Heckel, 1843)
Labiobarbus leptocheilus (Valenciennes, 1842)
Labiobarbus lineatus  (Sauvage, 1878)
Labiobarbus ocellatus (Heckel, 1843)
Lobocheilos falcifer (Valenciennes, 1842)
Lobocheilos ixocheilos Kottelat & Tan, 2008
Lobocheilos schwanenfeldii Bleeker, 1854
Mystacoleucus obtusirostris (Valenciennes, 1842)
Mystacoleucus padangensis (Bleeker, 1852)
Neobarynotus microlepis (Bleeker, 1851)
Neolissochilus hexagonolepis (McClelland, 1839)
Neolissochilus longipinnis (Weber & de Beaufort, 1916)
Neolissochilus soro (Valenciennes, 1842)
Neolissochilus soroides (Duncker, 1904)
Neolissochilus sumatranus (Weber & de Beaufort, 1916)
Neolissochilus thienemanni (Ahl, 1933)
Oliotius oligolepis (Bleeker, 1853)
Osteochilus bleekeri Kottelat, 2008
Osteochilus borneensis (Bleeker, 1857)
Osteochilus enneaporos (Bleeker, 1852)
Osteochilus intermedius Weber & de Beaufort, 1916
Osteochilus jeruk Hadiaty & Siebert, 1998
Osteochilus kahajanensis (Bleeker, 1856)
Osteochilus kappenii (Bleeker, 1856)
Osteochilus kerinciensis Tan & Kottelat, 2009
Osteochilus melanopleura (Bleeker, 1852)
Osteochilus microcephalus (Valenciennes, 1842)
Osteochilus scapularis Fowler, 1939
Osteochilus schlegelii (Bleeker, 1851)
Osteochilus serokan Hadiaty & Siebert, 1998
Osteochilus spilurus (Bleeker, 1851)
Osteochilus vittatus (Valenciennes, 1842)
Osteochilus waandersii (Bleeker, 1852)
Poropuntius tawarensis (Weber & de Beaufort, 1916)
Puntigrus tetrazona (Bleeker, 1855)
Puntioplites bulu (Bleeker, 1851)
Puntioplites waandersi (Bleeker, 1859)
Rohteichthys microlepis (Bleeker, 1851)
Schismatorhynchos heterorhynchos (Bleeker, 1854)
Striuntius lineatus (Duncker, 1904)
Systomus rubripinnis (Valenciennes, 1842)
Thynnichthys polylepis Bleeker, 1860
Thynnichthys thynnoides (Bleeker, 1852)
Tor tambra (Valenciennes, 1842)
Tor tambroides (Bleeker, 1854)

Family Danionidae
Boraras maculatus (Duncker, 1904)
Brevibora cheeya Liao & Tan, 2011
Brevibora dorsiocellata (Duncker, 1904)
Brachydanio albolineata (Blyth, 1860)
Kottelatia brittani (Axelrod, 1976)
Laubuka laubuca (Hamilton, 1822)
Luciosoma setigerum (Valenciennes, 1842)
Luciosoma spilopleura Bleeker, 1855
Luciosoma trinema (Bleeker, 1852)
Malayochela maassi (Weber & de Beaufort, 1912)
Pectenocypris korthausae Kottelat, 1982
Pectenocypris micromysticetus Tan & Kottelat, 2009
Pectenocypris nigra Wibowo, Ahnelt & Kertamihardja, 2016
Pectenocypris rubra Ahnelt, Wibowo & Prianto, 2019
Raiamas guttatus (Day, 1870)
Rasbora api Lumbantobing, 2010<ref name = Lumbantobing1></small></ref>
Rasbora argyrotaenia (Bleeker, 1850)
Rasbora arundinata Lumbantobing, 2014
Rasbora bankanensis (Bleeker, 1853)
Rasbora bindumatoga Lumbantobing, 2014
Rasbora caudimaculata Volz, 1903
Rasbora cephalotaenia (Bleeker, 1852)
Rasbora dusonensis (Bleeker, 1851)
Rasbora einthovenii (Bleeker, 1851)
Rasbora elegans Volz, 1903
Rasbora ennealepis Roberts, 1989
Rasbora haru Lumbantobing, 2014
Rasbora jacobsoni Weber & de Beaufort, 1916
Rasbora kalbarensis Kottelat, 1991
Rasbora kalochroma (Bleeker, 1851)
Rasbora kluetensis Lumbantobing, 2010
Rasbora lateristriata (Bleeker, 1854)
Rasbora leptosoma (Bleeker, 1855)
Rasbora maninjau Lumbantobing, 2014
Rasbora meinkeni de Beaufort, 1931
Rasbora myersi Brittan, 1954
Rasbora nematotaenia Hubbs & Brittan, 1954
Rasbora nodulosa Lumbantobing, 2010
Rasbora paucisqualis Ahl, 1935
Rasbora reticulata Weber & de Beaufort, 1915 (Nias) 
Rasbora rutteni (Weber & de Beaufort, 1916)
Rasbora spilotaenia Hubbs & Brittan, 1954 
Rasbora subtilis Roberts, 1989
Rasbora sumatrana (Bleeker, 1852)
Rasbora tawarensis Weber & de Beaufort, 1916
Rasbora tobana Ahl, 1934
Rasbora tornieri Ahl, 1922
Rasbora trilineata Steindachner, 1870
Rasbora truncata Lumbantobing, 2010
Rasbora vulcanus Tan, 1999
Trigonopoma gracile (Kottelat, 1991)
Trigonopoma pauciperforatum (Weber & de Beaufort, 1916)
Trigonostigma hengeli (Meinken, 1956)
Trigonostigma heteromorpha (Duncker, 1904)

Family Leptobarbidae
Leptobarbus hoevenii (Bleeker, 1851)

Family Paedocyprididae
Paedocypris progenetica Kottelat, Britz, Tan & Witte, 2006

Family Sundadanionidae
Sundadanio atomus  Conway, Kottelat & Tan, 2011 (Singkep)
Sundadanio axelrodi (Brittan, 1976) (Bintan)
Sundadanio gargula Conway, Kottelat & Tan, 2011 (Bangka)
Sundadanio goblinus Conway, Kottelat & Tan, 2011

Family Xenocyprididae
Macrochirichthys macrochirus (Valenciennes, 1844)
Oxygaster anomalura van Hasselt, 1823
Parachela cyanea Kottelat, 1995
Parachela hypophthalmus (Bleeker, 1860)
Parachela maculicauda (Smith, 1934)
Parachela oxygastroides (Bleeker, 1852)
Rasborichthys helfrichii (Bleeker, 1857)

Family Balitoridae
Balitoropsis ophiolepis (Bleeker, 1853)
Balitoropsis zollingeri (Bleeker, 1853)
Homaloptera ocellata van der Hoeven, 1830
Homaloptera ogilviei Alfred, 1967
Homaloptera orthogoniata Vaillant, 1902
Homaloptera parclitella Tan & Ng, 2005
Homalopteroides nebulosus (Alfred, 1969)
Homalopteroides cf. tweediei (Herre, 1940)
Homalopteroides wassinkii (Bleeker, 1853)
Homalopterula amphisquamata (Weber & de Beaufort, 1916)
Homalopterula gymnogaster (Bleeker, 1853)
Homalopterula heterolepis (Weber & de Beaufort, 1916)
Homalopterula modiglianii (Perugia, 1893)
Homalopterula ripleyi Fowler, 1940
Homalopterula vanderbilti (Fowler, 1940)
Neohomaloptera johorensis (Herre, 1944)
Pseudohomaloptera tecta Randall, Somarriba, Tongnunui & Page, 2022

Family Nemacheilidae
Nemacheilus fasciatus (Valenciennes, 1846) 
Nemacheilus jaklesii (Bleeker, 1852) (species inquirenda)  
Nemacheilus cf. kapuasensis Kottelat, 1984
Nemacheilus longipinnis Ahl, 1922
Nemacheilus papillos Tan & Kottelat, 2009
Nemacheilus papillosus (Perugia, 1893) (species inquirenda)
Nemacheilus pfeifferae (Bleeker, 1853)
Nemacheilus selangoricus Duncker, 1904
Nemacheilus tuberigum Hadiaty & Siebert, 2001

Family Vaillantellidae
Vaillantella euepiptera (Vaillant, 1902)
Vaillantella maassi Weber & de Beaufort, 1912

Family Cobitidae
Acantopsis dialuzona van Hasselt, 1823
Acanthopsoides molobrion Siebert, 1991
Kottelatlimia katik (Kottelat & Lim, 1992)
Kottelatlimia pristes (Roberts, 1989)
Lepidocephalichthys furcatus (de Beaufort, 1933)
Lepidocephalichthys hasselti (Valenciennes, 1846)
Lepidocephalichthys tomaculum Kottelat & Lim, 1992
Lepidocephalus macrochir (Bleeker, 1854)
Pangio alcoides Kottelat & Lim, 1993
Pangio anguillaris (Vaillant, 1902)
Pangio atactos Tan & Kottelat, 2009
Pangio bitaimac Tan & Kottelat, 2009 
Pangio cuneovirgata (Raut, 1957)
Pangio malayana (Tweedie, 1956)
Pangio muraeniformis (de Beaufort, 1933)
Pangio oblonga (Valenciennes, 1846)
Pangio piperata Kottelat & Lim, 1993
Pangio pulla Kottelat & Lim, 1993 (Bangka)
Pangio semicincta (Fraser-Brunner, 1940)
Pangio shelfordii (Popta, 1903)
Pangio superba (Roberts, 1989)

Family Botiidae
Chromobotia macracanthus (Bleeker, 1852)
Syncrossus hymenophysa (Bleeker, 1852)
Syncrossus reversus (Roberts, 1989)

Family Barbuccidae
Barbucca diabolica Roberts, 1989

Order Siluriformes

Family Bagridae
Bagrichthys hypselopterus (Bleeker, 1852)
Bagrichthys macracanthus (Bleeker, 1854)
Bagrichthys macropterus (Bleeker, 1854)
Bagroides melapterus Bleeker, 1851
Hemibagrus caveatus Ng, Wirjoatmodjo & Hadiaty, 2001                                                               
Hemibagrus hoevenii (Bleeker, 1846)
Hemibagrus capitulum (Popta, 1904)
Hemibagrus lacustrinus Ng & Kottelat, 2013
Hemibagrus velox Tan & Ng, 2000
Hemibagrus wyckii (Bleeker, 1858)
Hyalobagrus flavus Ng & Kottelat, 1998
Leiocassis aculeatus Ng & Hadiaty, 2005
Leiocassis bekantan Ng & Tan, 2018
Leiocassis hosii Regan, 1906
Leiocassis micropogon (Bleeker, 1852)
Leiocassis poeciloptera (Valenciennes, 1840)
Mystus abbreviatus (Valenciennes, 1840)
Mystus alasensis Ng & Hadiaty, 2005
Mystus bimaculatus (Volz, 1904)
Mystus castaneus Ng, 2002
Mystus gulio (Hamilton, 1822)
Mystus nigriceps Valenciennes, 1840
Mystus punctifer Ng, Wirjoatmodjo & Hadiaty, 2001
Mystus singaringan (Bleeker, 1846)
Mystus wolffii (Bleeker, 1851)
Nanobagrus armatus (Vaillant, 1902)
Nanobagrus stellatus Tan & Ng, 2000
Nanobagrus torquatus Thomson, López, Hadiaty & Page, 2008
Pseudomystus breviceps (Regan, 1913)
Pseudomystus carnosus Ng & Lim, 2005
Pseudomystus heokhuii Ng & Lim, 2008
Pseudomystus leiacanthus (Weber & de Beaufort, 1912)
Pseudomystus mahakamensis (Vaillant, 1902)
Pseudomystus moeschii (Boulenger, 1890)
Pseudomystus rugosus (Regan, 1913)
Pseudomystus stenomus (Valenciennes, 1840)
Sundolyra latebrosa Ng, Hadiaty, Lundberg & Luckenbill, 2015

Family Siluridae
Belodontichthys dinema (Bleeker, 1851)
Ceratoglanis scleronema (Bleeker, 1863)
Hemisilurus heterorhynchus (Bleeker, 1854)
Hemisilurus moolenburghi Weber & de Beaufort, 1913
Kryptopterus bicirrhis (Valenciennes, 1840)
Kryptopterus cryptopterus (Bleeker, 1851)
Kryptopterus eugeneiatus (Vaillant, 1893)
Kryptopterus limpok (Bleeker, 1852)
Kryptopterus macrocephalus (Bleeker, 1858)
Kryptopterus palembangensis (Bleeker, 1852)
Kryptopterus piperatus Ng, Wirjoatmodjo & Hadiaty, 2004
Kryptopterus schilbeides (Bleeker, 1858)
Kryptopterus cf. vitreolus Ng & Kottelat, 2013
Micronema hexapterus (Bleeker, 1851)
Ompok brevirictus Ng & Hadiaty, 2009
Ompok eugeneiatus Vaillant, 1893
Ompok fumidus Tan & Ng, 1996 
Ompok leiacanthus (Bleeker, 1853)
Ompok rhadinurus Ng, 2003
Phalacronotus apogon (Bleeker, 1851)
Phalacronotus micronemus (Bleeker, 1846)
Silurichthys hasseltii (Bleeker, 1858)
Silurichthys indragiriensis Volz, 1904
Silurichthys schneideri Volz, 1904
Wallagonia leerii Bleeker, 1851

Family Ailiidae
Laides hexanema (Bleeker, 1852)

Family Horabagridae
Pseudeutropius brachypopterus (Bleeker, 1858)
Pseudeutropius moolenburghae Weber & de Beaufort, 1913

Family Pangasiidae
Helicophagus typus Bleeker, 1858
Helicophagus waandersii Bleeker, 1858
Pangasius djambal Bleeker, 1846
Pangasius kunyit Pouyaud, Teugels & Legendre, 1999
Pangasius macronema Bleeker, 1850
Pangasius nasutus (Bleeker, 1863)
Pangasius polyuranodon Bleeker, 1852
Pseudolais micronemus (Bleeker, 1847)

Family Akysidae
Acrochordonichthys rugosus (Bleeker, 1847)
Acrochordonichthys ischnosoma Bleeker, 1858
Akysis fontaneus Ng, 2009
Akysis galeatus Page, Rachmatika & Robins, 2007
Akysis heterurus Ng, 1996
Akysis scorteus Page, Hadiaty & López, 2007
Breitensteinia cessator Ng & Siebert, 1998
Parakysis grandis Ng & Lim, 1995
Parakysis hystriculus Ng, 2009
Parakysis longirostris Ng & Lim, 1995 (Bintan)
Parakysis verrucosus Herre, 1940 (Bintan & Batam)
Pseudobagarius macronemus (Bleeker, 1860)

Family Sisoridae
Bagarius lica (Volz, 1903)
Glyptothorax amnestus Ng & Kottelat, 2016 
Glyptothorax famelicus Ng & Kottelat, 2016 
Glyptothorax fuscus Ng & Kottelat, 2016 
Glyptothorax keluk Ng & Kottelat, 2016
Glyptothorax ketambe Ng & Hadiaty, 2009
Glyptothorax pedunculatus (Roberts, 2021)
Glyptothorax platypogonides (Bleeker, 1855)
Glyptothorax plectilis Ng & Hadiaty, 2008
Glyptothorax robustus Boeseman, 1966
Glyptothorax schmidti (Volz, 1904)

Family Chacidae
Chaca bankanensis Bleeker, 1852

Family Clariidae
Clarias aff. batrachus (Linnaeus, 1758)
Clarias leiacanthus Bleeker, 1851
Clarias meladerma Bleeker, 1846
Clarias microspilus Ng & Hadiaty, 2011
Clarias nieuhofii Valenciennes, 1840
Clarias olivaceus Fowler, 1904
Clarias teijsmanni Bleeker, 1857
Encheloclarias cf. kelioides Ng & Lim, 1993
Encheloclarias tapeinopterus (Bleeker, 1853) (Bangka)
Encheloclarias velatus Ng & Tan, 2000

Family Ariidae
Arius maculatus (Thunberg, 1792)
Arius sumatranus ([Bennett], 1830)
Batrachocephalus mino (Hamilton, 1822)
Cephalocassis borneensis (Bleeker, 1851)
Cephalocassis melanochir (Bleeker, 1852)
Cryptarius truncatus (Valenciennes, 1840)
Hemiarius stormii (Bleeker, 1858)
Hexanematichthys sagor (Hamilton, 1822)
Ketengus typus Bleeker, 1846
Nemapteryx nenga (Hamilton, 1822)
Nemapteryx caelata (Valenciennes, 1840)
Netuma bilineata (Valenciennes, 1840)
Osteogeneiosus militaris (Linnaeus, 1758)
Plicofollis argyropleuron (Valenciennes, 1840)
Plicofollis dussumieri (Valenciennes, 1840)
Plicofollis polystaphylodon (Bleeker, 1846)
Plicofollis tonggol (Bleeker, 1846)

Family Plotosidae
Plotosus canius Hamilton, 1822
Plotosus lineatus (Thunberg, 1787)

Order Beloniformes

Family Adrianichthyidae
Oryzias javanicus (Bleeker, 1854)
Oryzias hubbsi (Roberts, 1998)

Family Zenarchopteridae
Dermogenys collettei Meisner, 2001 
Dermogenys sumatrana (Bleeker, 1854)
Hemirhamphodon phaiosoma (Bleeker, 1852)
Hemirhamphodon pogonognathus (Bleeker, 1853)
Zenarchopterus ectuntio (Hamilton, 1822)

Family Belonidae
Xenentodon canciloides (Bleeker, 1854)

Order Cyprinodontiformes

Family Aplocheilidae
Aplocheilus armatus (van Hasselt, 1823)

Order Atheriniformes

Family Phallostethidae
Neostethus bicornis Regan, 1916
Neostethus lankesteri Regan, 1916
Phenacostethus posthon Roberts, 1971
Phenacostethus smithi Myers, 1928

Order Syngnathiformes

Family Syngnathidae
Doryichthys boaja (Bleeker, 1850)
Doryichthys deokhatoides (Bleeker, 1853)
Doryichthys martensii (Peters, 1868)
Hippichthys spicifer (Ruppel, 1838)
Microphis brachyurus (Bleeker, 1854)
Microphis ocellatus (Duncker, 1910) (Simeulue, Nias)

incertae sedis

Family Ambassidae
Ambassis interrupta Bleeker, 1853
Gymnochanda filamentosa Fraser-Brunner, 1955
Gymnochanda limi Kottelat, 1995
Gymnochanda verae Tan & Lim, 2011 (Belitung)
Paradoxodacna piratica Roberts, 1989
Parambassis apogonoides (Bleeker, 1851)
Parambassis macrolepis (Bleeker, 1857)
Parambassis wolffii (Bleeker, 1851)

Family Toxotidae
Toxotes chatareus (Hamilton, 1822)
Toxotes jaculatrix (Pallas, 1767)
Toxotes sundaicus Kottelat & Tan, 2018

Family Polynemidae
Polydactylus macrophthalmus (Bleeker, 1859)
Polynemus dubius Bleeker, 1854
Polynemus multifilis Temminck & Schlegel, 1843

Family Scatophagidae
Scatophagus argus (Linnaeus, 1766)

Order Centrarchiformes

Family Kuhliidae
Kuhlia marginata (Cuvier, 1829)
Kuhlia rupestris (Lacépède, 1802)

Order Blenniiformes

Family Blenniidae
Phenablennius heyligeri (Bleeker, 1859)

Order Gobiiformes

Family Rhyacichthyidae
Rhyacichthys aspro (Valenciennes, 1837)

Family Eleotridae
Bunaka gyrinoides (Bleeker, 1853)
Eleotris melanosoma (Bleeker, 1853)
Eleotris sumatraensis (Mennesson, Keith, Sukmono, Risdawati & Hubert, 2021)
Giuris margaritacea (Valenciennes, 1837)
Hypseleotris cyprinoides (Valenciennes, 1837)

Family Butidae
Bostrychus sinensis Lacepede, 1801
Butis butis (Hamilton, 1822)
Butis gymnopomus (Bleeker, 1853)
Butis humeralis (Valenciennes, 1837)
Butis koilomatodon (Bleeker, 1849)
Butis melanostigma (Bleeker, 1849)
Ophiocara porocephala (Valenciennes, 1837)
Oxyeleotris marmorata (Bleeker, 1852)
Oxyeleotris urophthalmoides (Bleeker, 1853)
Oxyeleotris urophthalmus (Bleeker, 1851)

Family Oxudercidae
Boleophthalmus boddarti (Pallas, 1770)
Boleophthalmus dussumieri Valenciennes, 1837
Brachyamblyopus brachysoma (Bleeker, 1854)
Brachygobius doriae (Günther, 1868)
Brachygobius xanthomelas Herre, 1937
Caragobius urolepis (Bleeker, 1852)
Eugnathogobius siamensis (Fowler, 1934) 
Gobiopterus chuno (Hamilton, 1822)
Hemigobius hoevenii (Bleeker, 1851) 
Lentipes argenteus Keith, Hadiaty & Lord, 2014
Lentipes niasensis Harefa & Chen, 2022 (Nias)
Mugilogobius chulae (Smith, 1932)
Mugilogobius mertoni (Weber, 1911)
Mugilogobius platystomus (Günther, 1872)
Mugilogobius rambaiae (Smith, 1945)
Parapocryptes serperaster (Richardson, 1846)
Periophthalmodon schlosseri (Pallas, 1770)
Periophthalmodon septemradiatus (Hamilton, 1822)
Periophthalmus chrysospilos Bleeker, 1852
Periophthalmus gracilis Eggert, 1935
Periophthalmus spilotus Murdy & Takita, 1999
Periophthalmus variabilis Eggert, 1935
Pseudapocryptes elongatus (Cuvier, 1816)
Pseudogobiopsis lumbantobing Larson, Hadiaty and Hubert, 2017
Pseudogobiopsis oligactis (Bleeker, 1875) 
Pseudogobiopsis paludosa (Herre, 1940)
Pseudogobius avicennia (Herre, 1940)
Pseudogobius melanosticta (Day, 1876)
Pseudogobius poicilosoma (Bleeker, 1849)
Redigobius balteatus (Herre, 1935)
Redigobius bikolanus (Herre, 1927)
Redigobius chrysosoma (Bleeker, 1875)
Redigobius tambujon (Bleeker, 1854)
Schismatogobius arscuttoli Keith, Lord & Hubert, 2017
Schismatogobius bruynisi de Beaufort, 1912
Schismatogobius saurii Keith, Lord, Hadiaty & Hubert, 2017
Schismatogobius risdawatiae Keith, Darhuddin, Sukmono & Hubert, 2017
Sicyopterus longifilis de Beaufort, 1912
Sicyopterus macrostetholepis (Bleeker, 1853)
Sicyopterus micrurus (Bleeker, 1853) (Enggano)
Sicyopterus squamosissimus Keith, Lord, Busson, Sauri, Hubert & Hadiaty, 2015
Sicyopus zosterophorus (Bleeker, 1856)
Stenogobius gymnopomus (Bleeker, 1853)
Stigmatogobius pleurostigma (Bleeker, 1849)
Stigmatogobius sadanundio (Hamilton, 1822)
Stigmatogobius sella (Steindachner, 1881)
Stiphodon carisa Watson, 2008
Stiphodon maculidorsalis Maeda & Tan, 2013 
Stiphodon ornatus Meinken, 1974 
Stiphodon semoni Weber, 1895
Taenioides cirratus (Blyth, 1860)
Trypauchenopsis intermedia Volz, 1903

Family Gobiidae
Glossogobius giuris (Hamilton, 1822)

Order Anabantiformes

Family Helostomatidae
Helostoma temminkii Cuvier, 1829

Family Anabantidae
Anabas testudineus (Bloch, 1792)

Family Osphronemidae
Belontia hasselti  (Cuvier, 1831)
Betta bellica  Sauvage, 1884
Betta burdigala Kottelat & Ng, 1994 (Bangka)
Betta chloropharynx  Kottelat & Ng, 1994 (Bangka)
Betta coccina  Vierke, 1979
Betta cracens  Tan & Ng, 2005
Betta dennisyongi  Tan, 2013
Betta edithae  Vierke, 1984
Betta falx  Tan & Kottelat, 1998
Betta fusca  Regan, 1910
Betta hipposideros  Ng & Kottelat, 1994
Betta imbellis  Ladiges, 1975
Betta miniopinna  Tan & Tan, 1994 (Bintan) 
Betta pardalotos Tan, 2009
Betta pugnax  (Cantor, 1849)
Betta raja  Tan & Ng, 2005
Betta renata  Tan, 1998 
Betta rubra Perugia, 1893
Betta schalleri  Kottelat & Ng, 1994 (Bangka)
Betta simorum  Tan & Ng, 1996
Betta spilotogena  Ng & Kottelat, 1994 (Bintan, Singkep)
Luciocephalus aura  Tan & Ng, 2005
Luciocephalus pulcher  (Gray, 1830)
Osphronemus goramy  La Cepède, 1801
Parosphromenus bintan  Kottelat & Ng, 1998
Parosphromenus deissneri  Bleeker, 1859 (Bangka)
Parosphromenus gunawani  Schindler & Linke, 2012
Parosphromenus juelinae  Shi, Guo, Haryono, Hong, & Zhang, 2021 (Bangka)
Parosphromenus phoenicurus  Schindler & Linke, 2012
Parosphromenus sumatranus  Klausewitz, 1955
Sphaerichthys osphromenoides  Canestrini, 1860
Sphaerichthys selatanensis  Vierke, 1979 (Belitung)
Trichopodus leerii  Bleeker, 1852
Trichopodus trichopterus  (Pallas, 1770)
Trichopsis vittata  (Cuvier, 1831)

Family Channidae
Channa bankanensis (Bleeker, 1852)
Channa cyanospilos (Bleeker, 1853)
Channa limbata (Cuvier, 1831)
Channa lucius (Cuvier, 1831)
Channa marulioides (Bleeker, 1851)
Channa melasoma (Bleeker, 1851)
Channa micropeltes (Cuvier, 1831)
Channa pleurophthalma (Bleeker, 1851)
Channa striata (Bloch, 1793)

Family Nandidae
Nandus mercatus Ng, 2008
Nandus nebulosus (Gray, 1835)

Family Pristolepididae
Pristolepis fasciata (Bleeker, 1851)
Pristolepis grootii (Bleeker, 1852)

Order Acanthuriformes

Family Sciaenidae
Boesemania microlepis (Bleeker, 1859)
Panna microdon (Bleeker, 1849)

Order Spariformes

Family Lobotidae
Datnioides microlepis Bleeker, 1854
Datnioides polota (Hamilton, 1822)

Order Synbranchiformes

Family Synbranchidae
Monopterus javanensis Lacepède, 1800

Family Chaudhuriidae
Bihunichthys monopteroides Kottelat & Lim, 1994
Chendol keelini Kottelat & Lim, 1994
Nagaichthys filipes Kottelat & Lim, 1991

Family Mastacembelidae
Macrognathus circumcinctus (Hora, 1924)
Macrognathus maculatus (Cuvier, 1832)
Macrognathus tapirus Kottelat & Widjanarti, 2005
Mastacembelus armatus (Lacepède, 1800)
Mastacembelus notophthalmus Roberts, 1989
Mastacembelus erythrotaenia Bleeker, 1850
Mastacembelus unicolor Cuvier, 1832

Order Pleuronectiformes

Family Cynoglossidae
Cynoglossus feldmanni (Bleeker, 1854)
Cynoglossus microlepis (Bleeker, 1851)
Cynoglossus waandersii (Bleeker, 1854)

Family Soleidae
Achiroides melanorhynchus (Bleeker, 1850)
Achiroides leucorhynchos (Bleeker, 1851)
Brachirus panoides (Bleeker, 1851)

Order Tetraodontiformes

Family Tetraodontidae
Auriglobus amabilis (Roberts, 1982)
Auriglobus modestus (Bleeker, 1850)
Auriglobus nefastus (Roberts, 1982)
Carinotetraodon irrubesco Tan, 1999 
Chonerhinos naritus (Richardson, 1848)
Dichotomyctere nigroviridis (Marion de Procé, 1822)
Dichotomyctere ocellatus  (Steindachner, 1870)
Pao leiurus (Bleeker, 1851)
Pao palembangensis (Bleeker, 1852)

References

Specific

Checklist
de Beaufort, L. F. (1939). "On a collection of freshwater fishes of the island of Billiton". Treubia, 17: 189-198
Hadiaty, R.; Sauri, S. (2017). "Iktiofauna air tawar Pulau Enggano, Indonesia". Jurnal Iktiologi Indonesia, 17 (3): 273-287
Iqbal, M. (2011). Ikan-ikan di Hutan Rawa Gambut Merang-Kepayang dan Sekitarnya. Merang REDD Pilot Project, Palembang.
Iqbal, M.; Yustian, I.; Setiawan, A.; Setiawan, D. (2018). Ikan-ikan di Sungai Musi dan Pesisir timur Sumatera Selatan. Kelompok Pengamat Burung Spirit of South Sumatra, Universitas Sriwijaya & Zoological Society for the Conservation of Species and Populations, Palembang.
Kottelat, M.; Widjanarti, E. (2005). "The fishes of Danau Sentarum National Park and the Kapuas Lakes Area, Kalimantan Barat, Indonesia". The Raffles Bulletin of Zoology. Supplement No. 13: 139–173.
Kottelat, M.; Whitten, T.; Kartikasari, S. N.; & Wirjoatmodjo, S. (1993). Freshwater fishes of Western Indonesia and Sulawesi : Ikan Air Tawar, Indonesia Bagian Barat dan Sulawesi. Periplus Editions.
Md Sah, A. S. R.; Mansor, M.; Rudi, E.; Fadli, N.; Musman, M.  (2015). "A Preliminary Freshwater Fish Checklist of Pulau Weh, Nanggruh Aceh Darussalam, Indonesia". Malayan Nature Journal, 67 (3): 303-307
Ng, P. K. L.; Lim, K. K. P. (1994). "Freshwater fishes of Batam Island, Indonesia". Malayan Naturalist (Malaysia), 48 (2-3): 6-8
Roberts, T. R. (1989). "The freshwater fishes of western Borneo (Kalimantan Barat, Indonesia)". Memoirs of the California Academy of Sciences, 14: 1-210
Sukmono, T.; Margaretha, M. (2017). Ikan Air Tawar di Ekosistem Bukit Tiga Puluh. Yayasan Konservasi Ekosistem Hutan Sumatera & Frankfurt Zoological Society
Tan, S. H.; Tan, H.H. (1994). "The freshwater fishes of Pulau Bintan, Riau Archipelago, Sumatera, Indonesia". Tropical Biodiversity, 2 (3): 351–367
Tan, H. H.; Ng, H. H. (2000). "The catfishes (Teleostei: Siluriformes) of central Sumatra". Journal of Natural History, 34 (2): 267–303
Tan, H. H.; Ng, P. K. L.  (2005). "The Labyrinth Fishes (Teleostei: Anabantoidei, Channoidei) of Sumatra, Indonesia". The Raffles Bulletin of Zoology, Supplement No. 13: 115–138
Tan, H. H.; Kottelat, M. (2009). "The fishes of the Batang Hari drainage, Sumatra, with description of six new species". Ichthyological Exploration of Freshwaters, 20 (1): 1–96

'
'
'